Nayagaon may refer to:
 Nayagaon, Bihar, a census town in Bihar, India
 Nayagaon railway station
 Nayagaon, Mawal, Pune district, Maharashtra, India
 Nayagaon, Rajasthan, a village  in Rajasthan, India
 Nayagaon, Punjab, a small town in Punjab, India
 Nayagaon, Madhya Pradesh, a village  in Madhya Pradesh, India